The Party's Over (theatrically released as Last Party 2000) is a 2001 American documentary film about American democracy and politics.

The film is the first sequel to the documentary The Last Party.  A third documentary was made in the series, The After Party: The Last Party 3.

Synopsis
This documentary follows Philip Seymour Hoffman as a concerned citizen on an uncensored journey of the state of American democracy. The film examines how the American political process addresses, and often fails to address, the country's most pressing issues. The film answers the question, is there a difference between Republicans and Democrats?

Cast

Philip Seymour Hoffman—Narrator/Interviewer
Tim Robbins—Himself
Susan Sarandon—Herself
Jesse Jackson—Himself
Rudy Giuliani—Himself
Michael Moore—Himself
Bill Maher—Himself
Ben Harper—Himself
Noam Chomsky—Himself
Rosie O'Donnell—Herself
Melissa Etheridge—Herself
Courtney Love—Herself
Pat Robertson—Himself
Ralph Nader—Himself
Newt Gingrich—Himself
Barenaked Ladies—Themselves
Willie Nelson—Himself
Arlo Guthrie—Himself
Bonnie Raitt—Herself
Rage Against the Machine—Themselves
Stone Temple Pilots—Themselves
Steve Earle—Himself
John Kerry—Himself
Eddie Vedder—Himself
William Baldwin—Himself
Robert Downey, Jr.—Himself
Charlton Heston—Himself

References

External links

2001 films
2001 documentary films
Films about elections
American sequel films
Documentary films about American politics
Films produced by Donovan Leitch (actor)
2000s English-language films
2000s American films